Tarabalo is famous for a cluster of hot springs dotted over an area of 8 acres. Tarabalo is located in Nayagarh district of Odisha. Sulphur water of the springs having certain medicinal properties is believed to be useful for a long time treatment of skin diseases and also related to religious rituals.

Besides the clusters of hot sulfur springs, Tarabalo is well known for the scenic beauty of the region. The panoramic views and the greenery of the nature around makes Tarabalo an interesting picnic spot. At present, Tarabalo is a small settlement surrounded by vast agricultural tracts.

It is located at a distance of 75 Kilometers from the capital city of Bhubaneshwar.

References

Hot springs of Odisha
Nayagarh district